Anolis bahorucoensis, the Baoruco long-snouted anole or Bahoruco long-snouted anole, is a species of lizard in the family Dactyloidae. The species is endemic to Hispaniola.

References

Anoles
Reptiles of Haiti
Reptiles of the Dominican Republic
Reptiles described in 1933
Taxa named by Gladwyn Kingsley Noble
Taxa named by William Grey Hassler